Psammomoya is a genus of plants in the Celastraceae family, endemic to Western Australia. The genus was first described by Ludwig Diels and Ludwig Eduard Theodor Loesener in 1904, with the designated type species being Psammomoya choretroides.

There are four species in the genus:

 Psammomoya choretroides (F.Muell.) Diels & Loes.
 Psammomoya implexa Keighery
 Psammomoya ephedroides Diels & Loes.
 Psammomoya grandiflora Keighery

Description
In Psammomoya the leaves are opposite and decussate, and reduced to cataphylls (scales). The bracteoles are ovate and the floral disc is broad and fused.

References

Celastraceae
Celastrales genera